Bradburn may refer to:
Bradburn, Colorado
Bradburn, Manitoba
Bradburn (surname)